The 2014–15 Oregon State Beavers women's basketball team represented Oregon State University during the 2014–15 NCAA Division I women's basketball season. The Beavers, led by fifth year head coach Scott Rueck, played their games at the Gill Coliseum and were members of the Pac-12 Conference. They finished the season 27–5, 16–2 in Pac-12 play to win the Pac-12 regular season title. They lost in the quarterfinals of the Pac-12 women's tournament to Colorado. They received at-large bid of the NCAA women's tournament where they defeated South Dakota State in the first round before getting upset by Gonzaga in the second round.

Roster

Rankings

Schedule

|-
!colspan=9 style="background:#c34500; color:black;"| Exhibition

|-
!colspan=9 style="background:#c34500; color:black;"| Non-conference regular season

|-
!colspan=9 style="background:#c34500; color:black;"| Pac-12 Regular Season

|-
!colspan=9 style="background:#c34500;"|Pac-12 Women's Tournament

|-
!colspan=9 style="background:#c34500;"|NCAA Women's Tournament

See also
2014–15 Oregon State Beavers men's basketball team

References

Oregon State Beavers women's basketball seasons
Oregon State
2014 in sports in Oregon
2015 in sports in Oregon